Grant & Eisenhofer P.A. (also known as G&E) is an American law firm that specializes in complex litigation and arbitration, particularly in the areas of securities, antitrust, and shareholder rights. The firm was founded in 1996 by Jay Eisenhofer and Stuart Grant and has offices in Wilmington, Delaware and New York City. Grant & Eisenhofer has represented clients in a number of high-profile cases, including the Enron shareholder litigation and the WorldCom shareholder litigation.

History
The founding partners commenced their legal careers as litigators in Skadden Arps Slate Meagher & Flom's Wilmington office. They left Skadden together to join Philadelphia-based law firm Blank Rome Comisky & McCauley. During their time there, Grant and Eisenhofer acted as resident litigation partners.

In 1997, they founded Grant & Eisenhofer P.A. Eisenhofer has stated that they decided to switch from corporate defense to exclusively representing plaintiffs because "they wanted to be on the side of the good guys."

Stuart Grant argued the provisions of the PSLRA which allowed an institutional investor to act as lead plaintiff in securities class action cases. In this case, Gluck et al. v. Cellstar, The State of Wisconsin Investment Board was lead plaintiff and G&E was appointed lead counsel. The class recovered 56% of their losses. In 2000, the Kansas Public Employees Retirement System filed a suit against Digex, in which G&E was lead counsel for the plaintiff. The case settled in 2001 for $420 million. In 2004, Grant & Eisenhofer was recognized by Pensions & Investments magazine for "a hallmark in corporate governance" regarding the settlement in which HealthSouth's board of directors was completely replaced. Firm partners Jay Eisenhofer and Michael Barry co-authored the Shareholder Activism Handbook in 2005. The handbook is a guide for shareholders on matters relating to shareholder activism.

In 2014, the firm was reported to have been a major donor to state attorneys general associations, candidates, state party committees, and attorneys general running for governor.

References

External links
 

Law firms established in 1997
Law firms based in Delaware
Companies based in Wilmington, Delaware
1997 establishments in Delaware